Pole is a studio album by Pole. It was released by Mute Records in 2003. It features contributions from rapper Fat Jon, saxophonist Thomas Haas, and bassist August Engkilde.

Critical reception
At Metacritic, which assigns a weighted average score out of 100 to reviews from mainstream critics, the album received an average score of 66% based on 17 reviews, indicating "generally favorable reviews".

Andy Kellman of AllMusic gave the album 2 stars out of 5, saying, "All glitches and sediments have been scrubbed off; the beats are straightened out and made prominent; the odd bit of instrumentation that was once implied or misshapen beyond recognition now actually exists." Andy Battaglia of The A.V. Club called it "a stylistic side-step that trips and falls without making much of the tumble."

Track listing

Personnel
Credits adapted from liner notes.
 Stefan Betke – composition, production, mastering
 Fat Jon – lyrics, vocals (1, 4, 5, 8)
 Thomas Haas – saxophone (2, 7)
 August Engkilde – upright bass (7, 9)
 Bianca Strauch – artwork

References

External links
 

2003 albums
Pole (musician) albums
Mute Records albums